"Afterlife", alternatively titled, "Afterlife (Dickinson)", is a song by American singer-songwriter Hailee Steinfeld, being released as a single in promotion of the Apple TV+ original series Dickinson, also starring Steinfeld in the lead role. It was released on September 19, 2019 by Republic Records.

Background 
The song was released on September 19, 2019. It serves as a single from the soundtrack of the upcoming Apple TV series Dickinson, which also stars Steinfeld as renowned poet Emily Dickinson. Steinfeld announced the song via her social media accounts on September 14, 2019.

Music videos 
The Hannah Lux Davis-directed music video premiered on Steinfeld's YouTube channel on September 30, 2019, via YouTube premiere. Another video titled "For Your Consideration", featuring the cast of Dickinson and creator Alena Smith, was released on July 1, 2020.

Credits and personnel 
Credits adapted from Tidal.

 Hailee Steinfeld – vocals, backing vocals, songwriting
 Stargate – production
 Koz – production, songwriting, bass, drums, engineering, studio personnel, synthesizer programming
 Tim Blacksmith – executive production
 Danny D – executive production
 Kennedi Lykken – songwriting
 Mikkel Eriksen – songwriting, engineering, studio personnel
 Tor Erik Hermansen – songwriting
 Ira Grylack – engineering, studio personnel
 Thomas Warren – engineering, studio personnel
 Matty Green – mixing, studio personnel

Charts

Release history

References 

2019 singles
2019 songs
Hailee Steinfeld songs
Music videos directed by Hannah Lux Davis
Songs from television series
Songs written by Hailee Steinfeld
Song recordings produced by Stargate (record producers)
Songs written by Stephen Kozmeniuk
Songs written by Tor Erik Hermansen
Songs written by Mikkel Storleer Eriksen
Songs written by Kennedi Lykken